Spiraea cantoniensis, the Reeve's spiraea, bridalwreath spirea, double white may, Cape may or may bush, is a species of plant native to China, belonging to the rose family Rosaceae.

Description
It is a deciduous or semi-evergreen shrub that reaches a size of 1–2 m height, with many thin branches, arched, flexible and glabrous. The leaves are alternate, simple, small petiolate, with 2–6 cm long green lanceolate, elliptical-rhomboidal or slightly obovate lamina, with 3 nerves parallel from its base, irregularly crenate-dentate in its distal half. The leaves may turn a yellowish red colour in autumn. Blooming in spring and snow white in colour, its flowers are hermaphroditic, actinomorphic, of ± 1 cm diameter, arranged in axillary corimbos, each with 5 free sepals, 5 white petals, numerous stamens shorter than the petals. The fruit is a poly-follicle, with 3-5 plurisemined carpidia (follicles).

Cultivation
It is used as a screening or bordering plant alongside a fence line or as a conspicuous feature plant. May bushes prefer a full sun to partly shaded position with well drained soil, forgiving both light frost, wind, heat, poor soils and drought. It is generally best grown in cooler climates with protection from the hot afternoon sun which can cause leaf burn. Furthermore, the plant should be mulched and well-watered. Trimming and fertilisation may be need after flowering to keep a wedged growth habit and boost productive flowering in the next season.

Gallery

References

cantoniensis
Flora of China
Garden plants
Garden plants of Asia